The Cantonal School of Graubünden (also known as Kantonsschule Halde;) is the largest high school in the Swiss canton of Graubünden. It is located at the Alte Schanfiggerstrasse / Arosastrasse 2 next to the Theological College in Chur.

History 
The school was founded in 1850 by a merger between the Catholic and the Protestant Cantonal Schools, which were both founded in 1804. It was moved to the new building in the same year. According to its name, the Cantonal School of Graubünden is a school for the whole canton, and it is the only school in the whole of Switzerland where three languages must be used (German, Italian, Romansh). There are about 1,250 students (2012) attending classes at the school, taught by approximately 160 teachers.

Headmasters 
The school's headmaster is Gion Lechmann. The assistant and deputy headmasters are Cristina Maranta, Philippe Benguerel, Dieter Hasse and Otmaro Lardi.

Former students

External links 
 Website of the Cantonal School of Graubünden 

Grisons
Secondary schools in Switzerland